D'Agostino Supermarkets once a family-owned supermarket chain in the New York City area, is now owned by Gristedes. The store was founded in 1932 by brothers Pasquale and Nicola D'Agostino, in the pioneering phase of the supermarket industry. At D'Agostino's peak in the 1990s, the chain operated at 26 locations in New York City and adjacent Westchester County, with annual sales exceeding $200 million. By 2016 under financial pressure, D'Agostino's consolidated to nine stores (now ten), all in Manhattan, and sold a controlling interest to John Catsimatidis, owner of Gristedes.

Founding and expansion

 
The founders of D'Agostino Supermarkets, brothers Pasquale and Nicholas D'Agostino Sr., emigrated from the mountain village of Bugnara, Italy, arriving separately in New York City as teenagers in the 1920s. Due to their poverty, they skipped high school and instead furthered their education by assisting merchants including their father's fruit-and-vegetable pushcart business.

In 1932, the brothers bought a small shop on Manhattan's Upper East Side, a prosperous neighborhood whose residents could afford quality groceries even during the Great Depression. In 1939, the store moved to larger quarters nearby; the brothers named it the Yorkville Food Shoppe and added a meat department. In a key innovation, they gave people the opportunity to shop for meat, produce, dairy and baked goods in a single store, helping to pioneer and popularize the idea of the "supermarket". D'Agostino's flourished in the post-WWII economic boom and opened another large store in 1950, on 20th Street alongside Stuyvesant Town – Peter Cooper Village.

Pasquale died in 1960 and Nicholas ultimately bought out his share of the business, to serve as CEO, chairman and President, and to resolve the family succession issue. At this time, there were eight D'Agostino stores on Manhattan's East Side. With its reputation for quality meats, D'Agostino's ran popular ads in the 1960s that teased, "Please don't kiss the butcher," which led to jokes about the family owing money instead to the milkman or other bill collector instead.  Nicholas D'Agostino relinquished daily management to his sons, Stephen and Nicholas Jr., in 1964. With Nicholas Sr. continuing as chairman, Stephen became president and CEO in 1972, and Nicholas Jr. succeeded him in 1982.

During the 1970s, D'Agostino's expanded to Manhattan's West Side, and promoted the chain with sturdy plastic "D'Ag Bags" that were fashionable enough to bring further cachet. The store's singing commercials, created by Jo Foxworth, with the tag line, "Please, Mr. D'Agostino, Move Closer to Me," aired routinely on radio and television during this period. At its peak in the 1990s, after two generations of steady expansion, the chain operated at 26 locations in New York City and adjacent Westchester County, with annual sales exceeding $200 million.

Difficulties and downsizing
During the 2000s, D'Agostino's and similar stores experienced worsening competitive pressure from larger chains of supermarkets and drugstores. At the same time, worsening financial pressure from New York real estate costs, unionized labor expenses, and trade credit restrictions severely limited the cash available for refilling shelves. By 2016, under CEO Nicholas D'Agostino III, the chain consolidated back to nine stores, all in Manhattan, and was considering combining with Key Food, Gristedes, or another rival grocer. A $10 million line of credit from the owner of Gristedes helped stabilize operations.

Since the acquisition of a controlling interest of D'Agostino's by Gristedes(see above), D'Agostino's food and product selection and price points have largely changed to mirror Gristede's offerings. The meat counter, which often featured on-site butchers able to cut meat to customers' orders have almost entirely been removed and replaced by a "meat clerk." This, too models most Gristedes supermarkets, where meat and fish are pre-packaged and shipped to the individual stores. D'Agostino's once respected for its broad offerings high-quality in cheese has also been transformed largely to mirror the Gristedes chain.

Popular culture
D'Agostino's has long used the slogan "New York's Grocer" and has often appeared in entertainment media to convey the New York setting. The chain figured prominently in the 1974 film Death Wish, including a series of scenes within the store itself. The store also features in the 1975 movie, The Prisoner of Second Avenue. On television, D'Agostino's is where Will & Grace ran into each other a year after their falling out, and the store was often featured in the series Friends. In the 1991 novel American Psycho, serial killer Patrick Bateman shops at D'Agostino's. In Ghostbusters II, Dana Barrett is seen holding a bag of groceries from D'Agostino's. D'Agostino's is mentioned in the Drivin' N' Cryin' song "Honeysuckle Blue".

References

Further reading

External links
 

Supermarkets of the United States
Companies based in Westchester County, New York
Shops in New York City
Retail companies established in 1932
1932 establishments in New York City
Larchmont, New York
Family-owned companies of the United States